Communauté d'agglomération du Grand Cognac is the communauté d'agglomération, an intercommunal structure, centred on the town of Cognac. It is located in the Charente department, in the Nouvelle-Aquitaine region, southwestern France. Created in 2017, its seat is in Cognac. Its area is 754.3 km2. Its population was 69,262 in 2019, of which 18,670 in Cognac proper.

Composition
The communauté d'agglomération consists of the following 55 communes:

Angeac-Champagne
Angeac-Charente
Ars
Bassac
Bellevigne
Birac
Bonneuil
Bourg-Charente
Bouteville
Boutiers-Saint-Trojan
Bréville
Champmillon
Chassors
Châteaubernard
Châteauneuf-sur-Charente
Cherves-Richemont
Cognac
Criteuil-la-Magdeleine
Fleurac
Foussignac
Gensac-la-Pallue
Genté
Gimeux
Graves-Saint-Amant
Hiersac
Houlette
Jarnac
Javrezac
Juillac-le-Coq
Julienne
Lignières-Ambleville
Louzac-Saint-André
Mainxe-Gondeville
Mérignac
Merpins
Mesnac
Les Métairies
Mosnac-Saint-Simeux
Moulidars
Nercillac
Réparsac
Saint-Brice
Sainte-Sévère
Saint-Fort-sur-le-Né
Saint-Laurent-de-Cognac
Saint-Même-les-Carrières
Saint-Preuil
Saint-Simon
Saint-Sulpice-de-Cognac
Salles-d'Angles
Segonzac
Sigogne
Triac-Lautrait
Verrières
Vibrac

References

Cognac
Cognac